These are the results of the Liberty Bell Classic, an alternative to the 1980 Summer Olympics for the boycotting countries. It took place on July 16 and July 17, 1980, in Philadelphia, United States at the Franklin Field.

Men's results

100 meters

Heats – July 16Wind: Heat 1: +0.6 m/s, Heat 4: +1.6 m/s

Final – July 17Wind: +0.9 m/s

200 meters

Heats – July 16

Final – July 17

400 meters

Heats – July 16

Final – July 17

800 meters

1500 meters

5000 meters

110 meters hurdles
17 JulyWind: +2.7 m/s

400 meters hurdles
17 July

4 × 100 metres relay

4 × 400 metres relay

High jump
July 17

Pole vault

Long jump
July 17

Triple jump
July 17

Shot put

Discus throw

Hammer throw

Javelin throw

Decathlon
July 17/18

Women's results

100 meters

Heats – July 16

Final – July 17

200 meters

Heats – July 16

Final – July 17

400 meters

800 meters

1500 meters

100 meters hurdles

4 × 100 metres relay

4 × 400 metres relay

High jump

Long jump

Shot put

Discus throw

Javelin throw

Pentathlon
July 17

References

Islamic Solidarity Games
Events at athletics (track and field) competitions